Undead Corporation is a Japanese doujin musical group combining different styles of extreme metal formed in Tokyo in 2010.

History 
The group was formed in 2010 by the musical duo Kensuke "Shacho" Matsuyama and Hirano "Shiren" Yukimura of Unlucky Morpheus. Yukimura was replaced by vocalists Kubota Dōgen and Akemi two years after forming the group.

Between 2010 and 2016, the band released 14 albums and two EPs, which were influenced by the Touhou and KanColle franchises which resulted in the band gaining high popularity within the gamer and otaku communities. The albums Flash Back, No Antidote and J.O.I.N.T. managed to rank in the Oricon Albums Chart. The 2022 released album J.O.I.N.T. features guest vocals by Tom Barber of Chelsea Grin and Benji Webbe of Skindred.

On October 9, 2015 the band played their first international show in Hannover, Germany.

In March of 2019, Kensuke Matsuyama formed another death metal band called Devil Within featuring YU-TO on drums. The side project released their debut album Dark Supremacy the same year.

Discography 
 Gensō Sato Kara Chō Kōtetsu Omo Tei Bakuon (Album, 2010)
 Mangetsu No Yoru Ni Chōsenritsuteki Jūtei Bakuon (Album, 2010)
 Gokutetsu (Album, 2010)
 Oni Togezōshi (Album, 2011)
 Rare Tracks (EP, 2011)
 Watashi Wa Mō Shindeiru? (Album, 2011)
 Ichigeki (Album, 2011)
 Benisome No Oni Ga Naku (Album, 2012)
 O.D. (EP, 2012)
 Parallelism • γ (Album, 2012)
 Bōkun (Album, 2013)
 Shinsoku (Album, 2014)
 Tsuhamono (Mini-Album, 2014)
 Shunsatsu (Album, 2015)
 Flash Back (Album, 2015)
 Metta Ki (EP, 2015)
 Otoko (Album, 2015)
 Tamashii (Album, 2016)
 Live 2017 (Live-DVD, 2017)
 No Antidote (Album, 2017)
 Kabukimono (Mini-Album, 2017)
 Fake (Single)
 J.O.I.N.T. (Album, 2022)

Weblinks 
 Official homepage
 Undead Corporation at Discogs

Notes 

Doujin music
Japanese death metal musical groups
Musical groups from Tokyo